Movement Now is an economically liberal political party in Finland.

It was founded by then-National Coalition Party (NCP) member of parliament (MP) Harry "Hjallis" Harkimo and seven other people as a political movement. The movement was registered as a party on 14 November 2019. It is positioned on the centre-right on the political spectrum.

History
On 19 April 2018, member of parliament (MP) Harry Harkimo announced that he would resign from his party, the NCP. On 21 April, he announced that he had founded a political movement of his own called Movement Now. The movement had been founded by him and seven others and registered with the  one day before Harkimo's resignation from the NCP. The seven founding members are Harkimo, former SDP party secretary Mikael Jungner, Helene Auramo, Karoliina Kähönen, Sarian Antila, and Tuomas Enbuske.

On 21 January 2019, an MP of the Blue Reform and former Speaker of the Parliament of Finland Maria Lohela announced that she would leave the Blue Reform in order to join Liike Nyt's parliamentary group. In addition to the Parliament, the movement has gained members in municipalities. The group Parempi Heinola in the city assembly of Heinola joined Liike Nyt. With its eight members out of a total of 43, the movement is the largest in Heinola. A similar association with the Uusi Jämsä group of Jämsä was agreed upon in August 2018. Uusi Jämsä was the third largest group in the city council when joining the movement with its six members.

In the 2019 Finnish parliamentary election, Harkimo was elected to the parliament as the sole representative from Movement Now. 115 candidates stood for election, short of the movement's target of 150. Besides Harkimo, candidates included another founder of the party Auramo, and the former's  Mirita Saxberg. The party used controversial microtargeting in its campaign advertising.

In June 2019, Harkimo announced that the Movement Now would start collecting signed support cards in order to become a registered political party. The Ministry of Justice announced on 14 November 2019 that Movement Now had been registered as a political party.

Political stances 

Thirty core principles were agreed upon by members. Besides these, candidates are not aligned ideologically with the group and are allowed to take independent stances on local issues. Election themes include Baltic Sea clean up and social security for entrepreneurs.

The party defends generally liberal policies. In economics, it supports reducing the corporate tax and what they see as unnecessary regulations on businesses, and in social policy, the party defends legalizing the sale of alcohol in grocery stores.

In international policy, although the party believes that the European Union has been beneficial for Finland in many respects, the Euro currency has not, and that the debt and migration crises, along with Brexit, has forced the EU to reconsider in which areas Brussels is needed and where it is not. The party opposes a European superstate.

It also supports achieving carbon neutrality by 2045, instead of the Marin government's target of 2035, believing the latter to be unrealistic. The party also supports nuclear power.

The party believes in expanding private health care as a way of reducing queues in public health facilities.

It also believes that Finland should adopt a national D visa entitling skilled migrants to work while at the same time keeping out migrants who would be a burden on society. The party also advocates reforming the asylum system and mandating that immigrants should be integrated so that they become part of Finnish society, and that employment plans should be drawn up for all immigrants over the age of 18. It also believes that all incoming immigrants should prove that they will be active members in Finnish society, and that those who provide false information or committed serious crimes such as terrorism should be deported.

The main six principles of the party are:

 Everybody should be taken care of
 A free market is a good way to develop society, if its rules are fair
 Climate change is real and decisions must be taken in an environmentally sustainable manner
 Entrepreneurship is the most effective way to do things if given space
 Valuing the individual
 Pro-Europeanism

Election results

Parliamentary elections

Municipal elections

Presidential elections

Organization
The party's headquarters are on Abrahaminkatu in Helsinki. The party has about 8,000 members, and employs four people full-time. The chairperson of the party is Harry Harkimo.

Notes

See also
 Politics of Finland
 List of political parties in Finland
 Elections in Finland

References

Further reading

External links
 

2018 establishments in Finland
Liberal parties in Finland
Political parties established in 2018
Pro-European political parties in Finland
Registered political parties in Finland